ATX is a form factor for personal computer motherboards and power supplies.

ATX or AT-X may also refer to:
AT-X (TV network), a Japanese broadcasting service
Atbasar Airport, Kazakhstan
atx (markup language), a lightweight markup language
Austin, Texas, United States 
Austrian Traded Index, a stock market index of Austria
Autotaxin, an enzyme
Ford ATX transmission, an automobile component
Toyota Aurion AT-X, an automobile
atX (gene), produces 6-Methylsalicylic acid in Aspergillus terreus